This is a list of flag bearers who have represented Cayman Islands at the Olympics.

Flag bearers carry the national flag of their country at the opening ceremony of the Olympic Games.

See also
Cayman Islands at the Olympics

References

Flag bearers
Cayman Islands
Olympic flagbearers